Dichrorampha cinerascens is a moth belonging to the family Tortricidae first described by Aleksandr Sergeievich Danilevsky in 1948.

It is native to Northern Europe.

References

Grapholitini